Taxi to Gibraltar is a 2019 Spanish-Argentine buddy road movie and madcap comedy with adventure elements directed by Alejo Flah, starring Joaquín Furriel, Dani Rovira and Ingrid García-Jonsson.

Plot 
Diego (an Argentine con-man), León (a grumpy Spanish taxi driver) and Sandra (a woman dissatisfied with her life), embark on a road trip to Gibraltar set to look out for a gold treasure purportedly hidden in the tunnels below The Rock.

Cast

Production 
The screenplay was penned by  alongside Fernando Navarro. A Spain–Argentina co-production, the film was produced by La Terraza Films, Atresmedia Cine, Ikiru Films, Sacromonte Films, Código Sur Producciones and La Mano de Dios la Película AIE alongside Film Tonic and AZ Films. It was shot in Madrid, La Línea, and Gran Canaria.

Release 
Taxi to Gibraltar screened as the opening film of the 22nd Málaga Spanish Film Festival on 15 March 2019. Distributed by Warner Bros España, it also hit Spanish theatres on the same day. It premiered in Argentina on 14 November 2019.

Reception 
Raquel Hernández Luján of HobbyConsolas gave the film 58 out of 100 films (overall assessment: "so-so"), considering that despite the good casting, the very good shooting and resourceful production, the film fails because of the writing. She highlighted the Spanglish-speaking police agents from Gibraltar to be the best thing about the film. She however deemed García-Jonsson's and Rovira's unfunny characters to be a drag, whereas supporting actors José Manuel Poga and Mona Martínez featured too little screentime.

Reviewing for Cinemanía, Rubén Romero Santos scored 2 out of 5 stars, considering that despite a promising initial approach (successfully portraying the losers who cannot see the end of the economic crisis) the film is derailed by the inclusion of a romantic comedy, an episodic story and even an adventure-mystery story as subplots.

Juan Pando of Fotogramas rated the film with 3 out of 5 stars, highlighting Furriel's "touching" caricature of a deceitful Porteño as the best thing about the film.

See also 
 List of Spanish films of 2019
 List of Argentine films of 2019

References

External links 
 Taxi to Gibraltar at ICAA's Catálogo de Cinespañol

Films shot in the province of Cádiz
Films shot in the Canary Islands
Films shot in Madrid
Spanish road movies
Spanish comedy films
Argentine comedy films
Spanish adventure films
Argentine adventure films
2019 films
Atresmedia Cine films
Ikiru Films films
Sacromonte Films films
2010s Spanish-language films
2010s Spanish films
2010s Argentine films